John Chester Paddick (born 31 August 1943 in Newcastle-under-Lyme, England) is a British athlete. In 1964, he represented Great Britain and Northern Ireland in the Tokyo Olympics in the men's 20 kilometre walk event and came 10th overall with a time of 1 hour, 33 minutes and 28.4 seconds. He was just under four minutes behind the winner, Ken Matthews.

He currently lives in Redcar, North Yorkshire.  He is married to Spanish wife Concepcion and has two daughters.

References
 Olympic Record at the British Olympic Association
 Record of the race at Sportofworld.com
 Current walking record

1943 births
Living people
Sportspeople from Newcastle-under-Lyme
British male racewalkers
English male racewalkers
Olympic athletes of Great Britain
Athletes (track and field) at the 1964 Summer Olympics